Muhammad Syukri bin Azman (born 18 March 1997) is a Malaysian footballer who plays as a left-back.

Club career

Early year

Born in Selangor, Syukri joined Selangor's youth system as a 16-year-old, and continued climbing through the ranks until reaching Selangor under-21 squad in 2016.

Selangor
Syukri was named on the first-team bench for the first time on 9 August 2016 by caretaker coach, K. Gunalan for a Malaysia Cup match against Pahang. That day, he made his official debut with the Selangor first team, playing in the last four minutes. The match ended with Selangor win by 3–0.

Syukri showed talent and maturity at an early age, and success with the reserve and youth sides, winning the President Cup in 2017 and finished the season with 18 appearances (no goals). On 27 November 2017, Selangor under-21 manager, Ariffin Ab Hamid confirmed that Syukri would be definitely promoted to Selangor's first team for 2018 season.

Career statistics

Club

Honours

Club
Selangor
 President Cup (1): 2017

References

External links
 Profile at faselangor.my

1998 births
Living people
Malaysian footballers
Selangor FA players
Sarawak United FC players
Malaysia Super League players
Malaysian people of Malay descent
People from Selangor
Association football wingers
Association football midfielders